Hedgehog interacting protein (HHIP) is a protein that in humans is encoded by the HHIP gene.

This gene encodes a protein similar to the mouse hedgehog interacting protein, a regulatory component of the Hedgehog signaling pathway. Members of the hedgehog family are evolutionarily conserved proteins which are involved in many fundamental processes in embryonic development, including anteroposterior patterns of limbs and regulation of left-right asymmetry.

References

Further reading